Agononida nielbrucei is a species of squat lobster in the family Munididae. The species name is dedicated to Australian carcinologist Niel Bruce.

References

Squat lobsters
Crustaceans described in 2005